Cydia oxytropidis is a species of moth belonging to the family Tortricidae.

Synonym:
 Grapholitha oxytropidis Martini, 1912

References

Grapholitini
Moths described in 1912